Vilne may refer to the following places in Ukraine:

Crimea
Vilne, Dzhankoi Raion, urban-type settlement in Dzhankoi Raion

Vinnytsia Oblast
Vilne, Vinnytsia Oblast, village in Mohyliv-Podilskyi Raion